Scott Sharrard (born December 28, 1976) is an American musical artist widely known as the lead guitarist and musical director of the Gregg Allman Band. A prolific songwriter and talented singer, he has also released several soul-influenced albums of his own including three with his first band, The Chesterfields, followed by three solo albums and, most recently, the eponymous release by his current band, Scott Sharrard & the Brickyard Band, in 2013. In 2020, Sharrard was announced as a new member of Little Feat following the death of Paul Barrere.

Early life
Born and raised in Michigan, USA, Scott Sharrard often cites his father, also a guitarist and singer-songwriter, as his earliest influence. He began his musical career studying jazz at the High School for the Arts in Milwaukee, Wisconsin during the day and earning his stripes by playing and singing with local and visiting leading musicians such as Clyde Stubblefield, Willie Higgins, Harvey Scales, Buddy Miles, Luther Allison, and Hubert Sumlin by night.

New York
After high school, Scott Sharrard and core members of his band The Chesterfields moved their home base to New York City and eventually garnered critical appraise for their live shows and studio recordings.

After they disbanded in 2002, Sharrard continued to write and record on his own as well as collaborating in the New York City and Hudson Valley areas with a tightknit group of musicians that includes bassist Jeff "The Claw" Hanley, drummer Diego Voglino and multi-instrumentalists Moses Patrou and Jay Collins, longtime saxophonist for the Gregg Allman Band who eventually got Scott an audition. In 2013, they went into the studio and recorded an album as "Scott Sharrard & the Brickyard Band" and play around New York and other places along the East Coast when Scott isn't working with the Gregg Allman Band.

In 2011, Scott Sharrard also joined forces with drummer/vocalist Randy Ciarlante (The Band, Levon Helm) and Hammond B-3 player Bruce Katz (Gregg Allman Band, John Hammond, Delbert McClinton) to form a blues/soul/rock'n'roll power trio called CKS and played several shows in the New York City and Hudson Valley areas.

Gregg Allman Band
Scott Sharrard joined the Gregg Allman Band as lead guitarist in 2008 after auditioning by sitting in with the Allman Brothers Band at a show in Camden, New Jersey. Two of Scott's original songs have been performed by the Gregg Allman Band, "Endless Road" and "Love Like Kerosene". With Gregg Allman, in 2017 Sharrard co-wrote the song "My Only True Friend", the first track of Allman's last and posthumously issued studio album Southern Blood. It was also issued as a single. Sharrard wrote the song in the voice of Gregg's late brother, Duane Allman, as if speaking to him.

Discography
Dawnbreaker (2005)
Analog/Monolog (2008)
Ante Up (2009)
Scott Sharrard & The Brickyard Band (2012) 
Saving Grace (2018) 
Rustbelt (2021)

References

External links
Scott Sharrard official website
Scott Sharrard Interview on Guitar.com
Scott Sharrard Video Rig Tour on Guitar.com
Scott sits down with Ira Haberman of The Sound Podcast for a feature interview

Living people
People from Ann Arbor, Michigan
American male guitarists
American rock guitarists
20th-century American guitarists
21st-century American guitarists
Guitarists from New York City
American male singer-songwriters
Music directors
20th-century American male musicians
21st-century American male musicians
1976 births
Singer-songwriters from New York (state)
Singer-songwriters from Michigan